The beginthread function creates a new thread of execution within the current process.  It is part of the Microsoft Windows runtime library and is declared in the process.h header file.

Prototype
unsigned long _beginthread(void(* Func)(void*), unsigned Stack_size, void *Arg);

Func
Thread execution starts at the beginning of the function func. To terminate the thread correctly, func must call _endthread or end with "return 0", freeing memory allocated by the run time library to support the thread.

Stack_size
The operating system allocates a stack for the thread containing the number of bytes specified by stack_size. If the value of stack_size is zero, the operating system creates a stack the same size as that of the main thread.

Arg
The operating system passes Arg to Func when execution begins. Arg can be any 32-bit value cast to void*.

Return value
Returns the operating system handle of the newly created thread. If unsuccessful, the function returns -1 and sets errno.

Compiler switches
To compile a program using multiple threads with the Microsoft C/C++ Compiler, you must specify the /MT switch (or /MTd, for debug programs).

References

Process.h
Threads (computing)